Markersdorf is a municipality in the district Görlitz, Saxony, Germany.

Markersdorf is also the former German name of Markocice, a small township in Poland which lies about 25 kilometres directly to the south, near Bogatynia (ex-Reichenau in Saxony).

Geography 
 
Markersdorf lies at the foot of the Landeskrone, bordering the town of Görlitz to the east. The Weißer Schöps flows through the municipality.

References 

Populated places in Görlitz (district)